Ayke Agus (born 1949) is an Indonesian classical violinist and pianist, known primarily through her longtime collaboration with the violinist Jascha Heifetz.  She is one of the rare classical music performers who has performed as a soloist accompanied by an orchestra as a Multi-instrumentalist.

Early life 
A native of Indonesia, of Chinese, Dutch and Javanese ancestry, Agus was recognized as a child prodigy at the age of 7 on violin and piano. By the age of 11, she had learned everything Mr. Tan, her teacher in Yogyakarta, Indonesia, had to teach her.  He recommended that she continue her studies with Mr. Adidharma in Jakarta, 450 miles away.  The solution to the inherent logistics problem was for her to study with Mr. Adidharma in the summer, giving her the opportunity to study the piano during the rest of the year.

Agus was offered many scholarships, starting at the age of 7, but was unable to pursue them initially because her parents thought her too young to live on her own, and later because she was unable to obtain an exit visa.  A missionary, Sister Brigid Conboy, who was following Agus's career was able to arrange for a scholarship at Rosary Hill College near Buffalo, New York, United States.  After her first paid concert in May 1969, Governor  Ali Sadikin granted her the exit visa.

After achieving success in local competitions, she became the youngest member of the Buffalo Philharmonic Orchestra.  This was followed by two full scholarship offers: Juilliard School of Music, recommended by violin pedagogue Ivan Galamian and the University of Southern California.  With her acceptance into the Jascha Heifetz Master Class at USC began a lasting association with him that lasted until his death in 1987.

Education
 Studied on scholarship at Rosary Hill College (now Daemen University), Amherst, New York, 1969-1971
 Jascha Heifetz Master Class (at USC), 1971 - 1973
 Bachelor of Music, Performance, USC, 1974
 Master of Music, Performance, USC, 1976
 Honorary Doctorate Degree of Humane Letters, Daemen College, Buffalo, NY, 2007

Career as a musician 
As a teacher of master classes, private lessons, and as a public lecturer and performer, Agus has spent 30 years focused on continuing the Heifetz legacy, regarding his musical beliefs, principles, musical ethics, teaching of the Art of Musical Collaboration, and teaching of the Art of Writing Musical Transcription.

Agus' noted musical collaboration with other musicians include cellists Nathaniel Rosen and 
Jeffrey Solow, accordionist/composer Nick Ariondo, and violinists Sherry Kloss and Roberto Cani.

Association with Jascha Heifetz 
 Violin student in Heifetz's USC master class, 1971–1973
 Piano accompanist for Heifetz's USC master class and its auditions, 1973-1984
 Heifetz's personal accompanist and collaborator for music transcription, 1984–1987

Recording artist 
Agus has recorded three albums, and has collaborated with a number of other artists as an accompanist or chamber group member.  She combined her talents on both violin and piano on the album Ayke Agus Doubles which was created by using a Yamaha Disklavier piano to mechanically record her piano keystrokes for the accompaniment, which was then played back on the special instrument while she recorded the violin solo with it.

Performance artist 
Agus has performed as a violin and piano soloist, as a piano accompanist, chamber group member, and orchestra member throughout the United States, Asia, and Europe, including venues such as the House of Composers, St. Petersburg, Russia, and the Disney Concert Hall in Los Angeles.  On at least two occasions (2004 and 2008), she was a soloist on both instruments playing with the California Philharmonic Orchestra in the same concert.

Her piano playing has been described as that which "other pianists talk about with awe", and having a "swinging sense of rubato equal to the composer's challenge."

Her violin playing has been described as "illuminated with brilliance like that found in the rays of the sun," and "reminded us of Yehudi Menuhin."

Chamber music affiliations 
 Ariondo-Agus Duo
 Pacific Serenade Chamber Music Society
 The Ayke Agus Piano Trio
 The South Bay Chamber Music Society (1991–1997)
 Guest artist with various European professional music groups, including the Ysaye String Quartet and the Jacques Thibaud String Trio

Career as a writer, composer and educator

Author 
Agus published Heifetz As I knew Him in 2001, chronicling her 15 years with the violinist, and touching on both of their childhood experiences as well as a significant treatment on the Art of Collaboration as Heifetz taught it.

Transcriber 
Agus helped Heifetz transcribe over 50 transcriptions for violin and piano.  The last one, An American in Paris, by Gershwin, was left unfinished by Heifetz.  Agus continued their work on this piece and published it after Heifetz's death.

Instructor 
Agus gives master classes  and teaches piano, violin and chamber groups in her private studio.

Lecturer 
Since Heifetz's death in 1987, Agus has given numerous lectures in Europe, Asia and the US on the subject of The Art of Musical Collaboration, which she learned during her 15-year association with Heifetz.  The most notable of these was given on October 27, 2009 at the Rimsky-Korsakov St. Petersburg State Conservatory in Russia.

She has given lectures at the Royal Academy of Music in London, the La Jolla Summer Music Festival, the Colburn School of Performing Arts, University of Maryland, and University of Iowa City.

Discography

Piano

Soloist 

 Musical Mementos of Jascha Heifetz
 Ayke Agus Plays Schubert
 Where Dreams Become Sunlight

Accompanist 
 Ayke Agus Doubles
 The Infinite Trumpet, with trumpetist Malcolm McNab
 Treasured Vignettes for Violin and Piano, with violinist Yukiko Kamei
 Sherry Kloss Plays Forgotten Gems, with violinist Sherry Kloss
 3 Faces of Kim, the Napalm Girl: No. 3. Fearful, with violinist Deon Nielsen Price
 Sun Rays, with violinist Deon Nielsen Price and vocalist Darryl Taylor

Violin

Soloist 

 Ayke Agus Doubles
 Stille Antico

Chamber music 
 The Hall of Mirrors, A Quartet of Chamber Works by Mark Carlson (Pacific Serenades)
 Sun Rays (Crossroads Alley Trio)

Notes

References

External links 

 Interviews with Dennis Bartel of KUSC during the week prior to the premiere of the film Jascha Heifetz: God's Fiddler: April (11th  12th 13th 14th 15th), 2011

Indonesian pianists
Indonesian violinists
Living people
1949 births
Daemen College alumni
People from Yogyakarta
Indonesian people of Chinese descent
Indonesian people of Dutch descent
Javanese people
Indo people
21st-century pianists
21st-century violinists
Women classical pianists